Eleocharis quadrangulata is a species of spikesedge known by the common names square-stem spikerush and four-angled spikerush. It is native to eastern and central North America (from Texas and Florida north to Ontario and Massachusetts), with additional populations in California, Oregon, and west-central Mexico (Durango, Jalisco, etc.). It grows in and around freshwater in lakes, ponds, and other bodies of water. It is a rhizomatous perennial herb growing one half to one meter in height. The spongy, compressible stem is a few millimeters wide and sharply four-angled. The inflorescence is a single spikelet 1.5 to 7.5 centimeters long which is made up of several flowers covered in light brown bracts.

References

External links
Jepson Manual Treatment
Photo gallery

quadrangulata
Flora of North America
Plants described in 1803